The Valley of the Shadow may refer to:

 Valley of the Shadow, an episode of The Twilight Zone
an American Civil War project called The Valley of the Shadow
'The Valley of the Shadow (Kipling story)', a short story by Rudyard Kipling in Soldiers Three (1888)

See also
Valley of the Shadows